Abbasiya or Abbasiyya can refer to:

 Aabbassiyeh, a village in Lebanon
 Abbassia, district of Cairo
 Abbasiya Palace, located in the district
 Al-'Abbasiyya, a village in Israel
 Al-Abbasiyya, capital of the Aghlabid dynasty